The designation arte (or arquitectura) de (la) repoblación (literally, "art or architecture of [the] repopulation") was first proposed by José Camón Aznar in 1949 to replace the term Mozarabic as applied to certain works of architecture from the Christian kingdoms of northern Spain between the end of the 9th and beginning of the 11th centuries. Camón argued that these buildings were related stylistically to the architecture of Asturias and owed little to Andalusian styles. Moreover, since they were built by Christians living under Christian rule, neither were they Mozarabic (the Mozarabs being the Christians of Muslim Spain).

In Spanish historiography, the Repoblación is the expansion of Christian settlement in the Duero basin and the Meseta Central in the 9th–10th centuries.

History
The religious influences were inevitable given the presence of the  Islamic state of the Caliph of Córdoba, which was highly developed culturally, artistically and economically. However, it had long been suggested that the monumental buildings in northern Spain from this period were crafted by the modest groups of Mozarabic immigrants that settled in the areas of repopulation when the living conditions in Muslim al-Andalus became difficult to bear. As stated by professor Isidro Bango Torviso, suggesting that these immigrants were responsible for these buildings would be akin to suggesting that:

The art and architecture of the Repoblación is identified as the third subset of the Hispanic Pre-Romanesque period, by the phases that correspond to the Visigothic art and architecture and Asturian architecture. Its architecture is a summary of elements of diverse extraction, irregularly distributed, in such a way that on occasion elements of paleo-Christian, Visigothic or Asturian origin come to predominate, while at other times Muslim characteristics come to the fore.

Characteristics

Some of the identifying characteristics of the Repoblación ecclesiastic architecture are:
 Basilica or centralized plan; sometimes with opposing apses.
 Main chapel on a rectangular plan on the exterior and ultra-semicircular in the interior.
 Use of the horseshoe arch of Muslim derivation, somewhat more closed and sloped than the Visigothic.
 Generalized use of the horseshoe arch doorway or alfiz.
 Use of the twin and triple windows of Asturian tradition.
 Roofs composed of segmented vaults, including traditional barrel vaults.
 Grouped columns forming composite pillars, with Corinthian capitals decorated with stylized elements and cinctures joining the capital to the columns.
 Walls re-enforced by exterior buttresses.
 Evolution of rafter ornaments to great lobed offsets that support very pronounced eaves.
 Decoration similar to the Visigothic based on volutes, swastikas, and vegetable and animal themes forming projecting borders.
 A great command of the technique in construction, employing principally ashlar by length and width.
 Absence or sobriety of exterior decoration.
 Diversity in the floor plans, with small proportions and discontinuous spaces covered by cupolas (groined, segmented, ribbed of horseshoe transept, etc.).

Examples
The most representative buildings of the genre are:
 Monastery of San Miguel de Escalada (Province of León)
 Hermitage of Santo Tomás de las Ollas (Province of León)
 Church of Santiago de Peñalba (Province of León)
 Church of Santa María de Wamba (Province of Valladolid)
 Church of San Cebrián de Mazote (Province of Valladolid)
 Monastery of San Román de Hornija (Province of Valladolid)
 Chapel of San Miguel, Celanova (Ourense)
 Hermitage of Santa Céntola y Santa Elena de Siero (Province of Burgos)
 Hermitage of Santa Cecilia de Barriosuso (Province of Burgos)
 Church of Santa María, Retortillo (Cantabria)
 Hermitage of San Juan Bautista de Barbadillo del Mercado (Province of Burgos)
 Church of San Vicente del Valle (Province of Burgos)
 Tower of Doña Urraca, in Covarrubias (Province of Burgos)
 Church of Santa María, Lebeña (Cantabria)
 Hermitage of San Román de Moroso, Arenas de Iguña (Cantabria)
 Hermitage of San Baudelio de Berlanga, Caltojar (Province of Soria)
 Monastery of San Juan de la Peña, Jaca (Province of Huesca)
 Church of San Pedro de Lárrede (Province of Huesca)
 Monastery of San Millán de la Cogolla (La Rioja)
 Monastery of San Salvador de Tábara (Zamora)
 Church of Sant Cristòfol, Cabrils (Province of Barcelona)
 Church of Sant Julià de Boada (Province of Girona)
 Church of Santa Maria de Matadars (Province of Barcelona)

See also
 Spain in the Middle Ages
 Reconquista

Notes

References
Bango Torviso, Isidro G. "Arquitectura de la decima centuria: ¿Repoblación o mozárabe?" Goya: Revista de arte 122 (1974), pp. 68–75.
Bango Torviso, Isidro G. "Arquitectura de repoblación", pp. 167–216. In Javier Rivera Blanco, Francisco Javier de la Plaza Santiago and Simón Marchán Fiz (eds.), Historia del arte de Castilla y León, Vol. 1, Prehistoria, Edad Antigua y arte prerrománico. Valladolid, 1994.
Camón Aznar, J. "Arquitectura española del siglo X: Mozárabe y de la repoblación". Goya: Revista de arte 52 (1963), pp. 206–19.
Canellas López, Ángel; San Vicente, Ángel. Rutas románicas de Aragón. Madrid, 1996.
Martínez Tejera, Artemio Manuel. "El contraábside en la arquitectura de la repoblación: el grupo castellano-leonés",  pp. 57–76. III Curso de Cultura Medieval. Seminario: Repoblación y Reconquista (Centro de Estudios del Románico, Aguilar de Campoo, septiembre 1991). Madrid, 1993.
Martínez Tejera, Artemio Manuel. "La arquitectura cristiana hispánica de los siglos IX y X en el Regnum Astur-leonés". Argutorio 14 (2004), pp. 9–12
Monedero Bermejo, Miguel Ángel. La arquitectura de la repoblación en la provincia de Cuenca. Cuenca, 1982.
Moreno, Manuel Gómez. Iglesias mozárabes. Madrid, 1917.
Utrero Agudo, María de los Ángeles. Iglesias tardoantiguas y altomedievales en la península ibérica: análisis arqueológico y sistemas de abovedamiento. Madrid, 2006.
Werckmeister, O. K. "Art of the Frontier: Mozarabic Monasticism", pp. 121–32. In Metropolitan Museum of Art, The Art of Medieval Spain, A.D. 500–1200. New York, 1993. 

 
 
Reconquista
Romanesque architecture in Spain